High Forest is an unincorporated community in High Forest Township, Olmsted County, Minnesota, United States, near Rochester and Stewartville.  The community is located near the junction of Olmsted County Roads 6 and 8, and Covill Street SW.

History
High Forest was platted in 1855, and named for the forests near the original town site. A post office was established at High Forest in 1856, and remained in operation until 1902.

References

Former municipalities in Minnesota
Unincorporated communities in Olmsted County, Minnesota
Unincorporated communities in Minnesota